Tmesisternus postflavescens is a species of beetle in the family Cerambycidae. It was described by Stephan von Breuning in 1948. It is known to be from Papua New Guinea.

References

postflavescens
Beetles described in 1948